The following is a list of telenovelas produced by Televisa in the 1990s.

List

References 

Televisa 1990s
Mexican television-related lists
 1990s